Geneviève Pettersen (born 1982) is a Canadian writer from Quebec. Her debut novel, La déesse des mouches à feu (2014), was awarded the Grand Prix littéraire Archambault.

Biography
Pettersen was born in Wendake, Quebec, 1982.

She wrote "Madame Chose", a lifestyle and food blog and column for La Presse. In 2014, she published Vie et mort du couple : du dating au divorce, de Madame Chose, a collection of her Madame Chose writing about relationships.

Her debut novel La déesse des mouches à feu was published in 2014. The novel won the Grand Prix littéraire Archambault in 2015, and its English translation by Neil Smith, The Goddess of Fireflies, was a shortlisted nominee for the Governor General's Award for French to English translation at the 2016 Governor General's Awards. La déesse des mouches à feu was adapted by film director Anaïs Barbeau-Lavalette for the 2020 film Goddess of the Fireflies.

Pettersen was formerly married to writer Samuel Archibald.

References

1982 births
21st-century Canadian novelists
Canadian women novelists
Canadian novelists in French
Canadian bloggers
Writers from Quebec
French Quebecers
Living people
People from Capitale-Nationale
21st-century Canadian women writers
Canadian women bloggers